Jill Allyn Rosser (born 1957 in Bethlehem, Pennsylvania), who published under J. Allyn Rosser, is a contemporary American poet.

Life
She grew up in Sparta Township, New Jersey.
She graduated from Middlebury College with a B.A. in French and English in 1980' from University of Pennsylvania with a M.A. in English Literature and Writing in 1988; and University of Pennsylvania with a Ph.D. in English Literature in 1991.

She lives in Athens, Ohio, teaching at Ohio University.
She is editor of New Ohio Review.

Her poems have appeared in several anthologies, and journals including The Atlantic Monthly, Ninth Letter and Poetry.

Her husband is the poet Mark Halliday.

Awards
 Samuel French Morse Prize, for Bright Moves
 Crab Orchard Award, for Misery Prefigured
 2007 The New Criterion Poetry Prize for Foiled Again 
2010 Guggenheim Fellowship

Selected works
"Unthought", Slate, Nov. 30, 2004
"Coming Your Way", Poetry (February 1994)
 Bright Moves (Boston, Massachusetts: Northeastern University Press, 1990) 
Misery Prefigured, Southern Illinois University Press, 2001, 
Foiled Again, Chicago: Ivan R. Dee, 2007, 
Mimi's Trapeze, University of Pittsburgh Press, 2014,

Anthologies
"Lover Release Agreement"; "Resurfaced", Poets of the new century, editor Roger Weingarten, Richard Higgerson, David R. Godine Publisher, 2003,

References

External links
"J. Allyn Rosser Reads Her Poetry"
"Poet's Choice", The Washington Post, Robert Pinsky, December 16, 2007

1957 births
Living people
People from Sparta, New Jersey
American women poets
21st-century American women